Ed Davis (August 31, 1890 – November 26, 1956) was an American politician in the state of Washington. He served in the Washington House of Representatives from 1917 to 1933. He was Speaker of the House from 1929 to 1931.

References

1956 deaths
1890 births
Republican Party members of the Washington House of Representatives
20th-century American politicians